The 2018 Esiliiga was the 28th season of the Esiliiga, the second-highest Estonian league for association football clubs, since its establishment in 1992. The season began on 1 March 2018 and concluded on 11 November 2018. Defending champions Maardu Linnameeskond won their second Esiliiga title.

Teams
Ten teams competed in the league – the seven teams from the previous season and the three teams promoted from the Esiliiga B. The promoted teams were Nõmme Kalju U21 (returning to the Esiliiga after a one-year absence), Tallinna Kalev U21 and Keila (both teams playing in the Esiliiga for the first time ever). They replaced Tallinna Kalev, Kuressaare (both teams promoted to the Meistriliiga) and FCI Tallinn U21 (merged with Levadia U21).

Stadiums and locations

Personnel and kits

Managerial changes

League table

Play-offs

Promotion play-offs

First leg

Second leg

Kuressaare won 2–0 on aggregate and retained their place in the 2019 Meistriliiga.

Relegation play-offs

First leg

Second leg

Järve won 3–2 on aggregate and were promoted to the 2019 Esiliiga.

Results

First half of the season

Second half of the season

Season statistics

Top scorers

Awards

Monthly awards

Esiliiga Player of the Year
Vitali Gussev was named Esiliiga Player of the Year.

See also
 2017–18 Estonian Cup
 2018–19 Estonian Cup
 2018 Meistriliiga
 2018 Esiliiga B

References

Esiliiga seasons
2
Estonia
Estonia